Rildo de Andrade Felicissimo (born 20 March 1989), simply known as Rildo, is a Brazilian professional footballer who plays as a forward for São Caetano.

Club career
Born in São Paulo, Rildo played amateur football until joining Fernandópolis in 2009, and help the club in their promotion from Campeonato Paulista Segunda Divisão. In the following year, he moved to Ferroviária, but was rarely used.

In January 2011 Rildo signed with Vitória. On 30 July he was sent off in a 0–1 home loss against Boa Esporte, after trying to kick the referee.

On 6 June 2012 Rildo signed with Ponte Preta, for a R$300,000 fee. He made his Série A debut on the 24th, in a 2–1 away win over Botafogo. He scored his first top flight goal on 10 October, in a 2–1 home win over Náutico.

On 31 January 2014 Rildo joined Santos in a one-year loan deal. He appeared in 22 league matches for the club, scoring one goal, but Peixe opted to not sign him permanently.

On 3 July 2015, Rildo joined fellow top level club Corinthians in a loan deal until December 2016.

On 1 January 2017, Rildo signed with Coritiba.

In March 2019, he moved to Chapecoense.

Career statistics

Honours
Corinthians
Campeonato Brasileiro Série A: 2015

Coritiba
Campeonato Paranaense: 2017

References

External links
 
 

1989 births
Living people
Brazilian footballers
Brazilian expatriate footballers
Footballers from São Paulo
Association football forwards
Campeonato Brasileiro Série A players
Campeonato Brasileiro Série B players
Campeonato Brasileiro Série C players
K League 1 players
Fernandópolis Futebol Clube players
Associação Ferroviária de Esportes players
Esporte Clube Vitória players
Associação Atlética Ponte Preta players
Santos FC players
Sport Club Corinthians Paulista players
Coritiba Foot Ball Club players
CR Vasco da Gama players
Associação Chapecoense de Futebol players
Daegu FC players
Avaí FC players
Paysandu Sport Club players
Associação Desportiva São Caetano players
Brazilian expatriate sportspeople in South Korea
Expatriate footballers in South Korea